Five ships of the British Royal Navy have borne the name HMS Sceptre, after the sceptre, a symbol of royal authority.

 The first , launched in 1781, was a 64-gun third-rate ship of the line. She was lost with 291 hands during a violent storm in Table Bay, near the Cape of Good Hope, when a series of anchor cables parted in the rising winds on 5 November 1799.
 The second , launched in 1802, was a 74-gun third-rate ship of the line. In 1815, she was decommissioned at Chatham. Her final years were spent in the Channel blockade of the French before she was finally broken up in 1821.
She survived World War I and was sold for disposal in 1926.
 The fourth , launched in 1943, was a 1940-programme S-class submarine. She served in World War II and was sold to BISCO for scrap in August 1949.
 The present , launched in 1976, is a  nuclear submarine.

Battle honours 
Ships named Sceptre have earned the following battle honours:
Trincomalee, 1782
Cape of Good Hope, 1795
Guadeloupe, 1810
Norway, 1944
Atlantic, 1944
Biscay, 1944

See also 
 

Royal Navy ship names